Pascal Havet (born 21 June 1964) is a French former professional footballer who played as a defender.

References

1964 births
Living people
French footballers
Paris Saint-Germain F.C. players
Red Star F.C.  players
Olympique Lyonnais players
FC Rouen players
Angoulême Charente FC players
Association football defenders
Ligue 1 players
Ligue 2 players